European route E96 or E96 is a European route running from İzmir in Turkey (connected to European route E881) to Sivrihisar (in Turkey), which is connected to European route E90. The road is a Class A West-East reference road in the European road network.

History 
The road was previously known as E23. in the mid 1980s the route was added to the new road numbering system as the E96. In the 2000, the route was removed from the road numbering system. At the urging of the Turkish Government in 2005, the route was once again assigned the number E96.

Route 

: İzmir - Kemalpaşa
: Kemalpaşa - Turgutlu - Salihli - Uşak - Afyonkarahisar - Emirdag - Sivrihisar

External links 
 UN Economic Commission for Europe: Overall Map of E-road Network (2007)
 Length E96

96
E096